The canton of Pacy-sur-Eure is an administrative division of the Eure department, northern France. Its borders were modified at the French canton reorganisation which came into effect in March 2015. Its seat is in Pacy-sur-Eure.

It consists of the following communes:

Aigleville
Boisset-les-Prévanches
La Boissière
Breuilpont
Bueil
Caillouet-Orgeville
Chaignes
Chambray
La Chapelle-Longueville
Le Cormier
Croisy-sur-Eure
Douains
Fains
Fontaine-sous-Jouy
Gadencourt
Hardencourt-Cocherel
Hécourt
La Heunière
Houlbec-Cocherel
Jouy-sur-Eure
Ménilles
Mercey
Merey
Neuilly
Pacy-sur-Eure
Le Plessis-Hébert
Rouvray
Sainte-Colombe-près-Vernon
Saint-Marcel
Saint-Vincent-des-Bois
Vaux-sur-Eure
Villegats
Villez-sous-Bailleul
Villiers-en-Désœuvre

References

Cantons of Eure